Charlton Island is the westernmost of the Frazier Islands, lying in Vincennes Bay off Wilkes Land in East Antarctica.

History
The island was mapped from air photographs taken in the course of the US Navy's Operations Highjump (1946–47) and Windmill (1947-48). It was named by Carl R. Eklund for Chief Electronics Technician Frederick E. Charlton, of the Wilkes Station party, 1957.

Antarctic Specially Protected Area
The island forms part of the Frazier Islands Antarctic Specially Protected Area (ASPA) No.160 because it supports one of only four known breeding colonies of southern giant petrels on continental Antarctica.

See also
 List of Antarctic and subantarctic islands

References

Islands of Wilkes Land
Antarctic Specially Protected Areas
Seabird colonies